This is a list of notable past pupils of Blackrock College (Irish: Coláiste na Carraige Duibhe), a Catholic, voluntary secondary school for boys aged 14–18, in Williamstown, Blackrock, County Dublin, Ireland. The college was founded by French missionaries in 1860, to act as a school and civil service training centre. Set in 0.25 square kilometres (62 acres) of grounds, it has an illustrious sporting tradition. The college, 7 kilometres (4.3 mi) from Dublin city centre is just in from the sea, and is self-contained, with a large boarding school and teaching facilities. Now run by a lay foundation in trust, it maintains high academic standards and requires all pupils to participate in non-academic activities. The missionary tradition continues with charity programmes, especially at Christmas. It accommodates approximately 1,100 day (primarily) and boarding students.

Literature
Brian O'Nolan, wrote the novels At Swim-Two-Birds (1939) and The Third Policeman (1967) under the pen name Flann O'Brien. A career civil servant, he also wrote satirical columns in The Irish Times under the pseudonym Myles na gCopaleen.
Pádraic Ó Conaire (28 February 1882 – 6 October 1928) was a writer and journalist who wrote in Irish, particularly about Irish emigrants in the UK.
 Joseph O'Connor, Author
Liam O'Flaherty (28 August 1896 – 7 September 1984) was a novelist and short story writer, known for The Informer, he was a major figure in the Irish Renaissance.
Tim Pat Coogan is an Irish historian and journalist. He attended Blackrock in the late 1940s.
Paul Murray, (b. 1975) a novelist, author of Skippy Dies

Journalism
Paddy Murray, a journalist, who served as Editor of the Sunday Tribune from 2002 to 2005.
Rory Carroll, a foreign reporter for The Guardian, he gained international attention when he was kidnapped in Baghdad in 2005. He was released unharmed.
David McWilliams, an economics journalist and broadcaster.
Paul Tansey, was the Economics Editor of The Irish Times; he also founded a business consultancy.

Business
David J. O'Reilly, chairman and CEO of Chevron Corporation.
Lochlann Quinn, former chairman of AIB, co-founder of Glendimplex Group
Dr. Brendan O'Regan CBE, visionary businessman responsible for transforming Shannon Airport and the Shannon Region and deeply involved in the peace and cooperation process in Ireland  
Eddie O'Connor, founder and CEO of Airtricity and Mainstream Renewable Power
Derek Quinlan, real estate investor

Politics and government
Éamon de Valera was one of the leaders of the Irish War of Independence, after which he served as Taoiseach of Ireland six times, introduced the 1937 Constitution of Ireland, and served two terms as Uachtarán na hÉireann. He was a pupil and later Professor of Mathematics at Blackrock.
Ruairi Quinn, TD, was Minister for Education and Skills in the Government of Ireland. He served as the Minister for Finance from 1994 to 1997, and leader of the Labour Party from 1997 to 2002. He was a pupil at Blackrock in the early 1960s, where he was successful in rugby, athletics and art.
Barry Andrews, a teacher, served as TD for Dún Laoghaire from 2002 until 2011. He was the Minister for Children from 2008 until 2011.
Rory O'Hanlon was a Teachta Dála for Cavan–Monaghan from 1977 until 2011. He served in a range of cabinet positions and as Ceann Comhairle of Dáil Éireann.
Niall Ó Brolcháin was the Mayor of Galway from 2006 to 2007. He has also served as a county councillor and senator.
James McNeill, was an Irish politician and diplomat, who served as the first High Commissioner to London and second Governor-General of the Irish Free State from 1927 to 1932.
Art O'Connor, elected Sinn Féin MP for Kildare South in 1918, he joined the then revolutionary parliament called Dáil Éireann. In the 2nd Dáil he served as Secretary for Agriculture from 1921 to 1922.
Eoin Ó Broin, Socialist theorist, member of the Sinn Féin
David P. Doyle, Ambassador, St. Kitts and Nevis to UNESCO

Legal
Ronan Keane, Former Chief Justice of the Supreme Court of Ireland
Dermot Gleeson, Former Attorney General, Current Chairman of AIB
Michael Moriarty, High Court Judge
John Quirke, High Court Judge
David Barniville, High Court Judge
Seamus Egan, former Justice of the Supreme Court of Ireland
Vivion de Valera, son of Éamon de Valera, he served in the Army during The Emergency, then as a T.D.

Humanitarian
Frank Duff, Founder of the Legion of Mary
Niall O'Brien, Missionary

Academic
James Macmahon
Bryan Patrick Beirne
Alfred O'Rahilly

Arts
Paul Costelloe
Fergus Martin
Michael McGlynn
Ronan Murray
Pauric Sweeney, Fashion Designer
Robert Ballagh
Eden (musician)

Clergy
John Cardinal D'Alton
Eugene Joseph Butler C.S.Sp., Bishop of Zanzibar, and Bishop of Mombasa
Robert Ellison B.Sc., S.T.L., C.S.Sp., Bishop of Banjui, Gambia. 
John G. Neville C.S.Sp. 1858–1943, purchased Clareville for Blackrock, Bishop of Zanzibar, and Kenya, ordained in Blackrock. 
Ambrose Kelly C.S.Sp., Bishop of Freetown and Bo, Sierre Leone
Daniel Liston BA, BCL, DD, C.S.Sp., Bishop of Port Louis in Mauritius (1947–1968). 
John Joseph McCarthy C.S.Sp., Bishop of Nairobi, Kenya.
John Charles McQuaid (Archbishop of Dublin)
Michael Joseph Moloney C.B.E., C.S.Sp.,(1912–1991) Bishop of Banjui, Gambia. Leinster Schools Rugby Cup winning Captain in 1928 and 1929.
Donal Murray, Bishop of Limerick
John Joseph O'Gorman, C.S.Sp., first Bishop from the Irish Holy Ghost Fathers, first Bishop of Sierra Leone.
John C. O'Riordan, C.S.Sp., Bishop of the Roman Catholic Diocese of Kenema in Sierra Leone.
Joseph Brendan Whelan, BA, S.T.L, C.S.Sp.(1909–1990), served as Bishop of Owerri in Nigeria

Sport
Brian O'Driscoll was, since 2004, the captain of the Irish national rugby union team. He attended Blackrock college from 1992 to 1998, where he first played rugby.
Nicolas Roche (professional cyclist)
Leo Cullen
Shane Byrne
Victor Costello (Irish international rugby player and Olympic shot-putter)
Hugo MacNeill
Fergus Slattery (1970s rugby player, part of famous 1974 Lions Tour)
Neil Francis
Alain Rolland (Irish international rugby player and international rugby referee)
Luke Fitzgerald (Irish international rugby player)
Mark Vaughan (Dublin Gaelic Footballer)
Cian O'Sullivan (Dublin Gaelic Footballer)
Michael Darragh MacAuley (Dublin Gaelic Footballer)
Ian Madigan (Irish international rugby player)
Jason Harris-Wright (Leinster Rugby and Connacht Rugby professional rugby union player)
David Quinlan (retired Irish international rugby player)
Cillian Willis (Leinster Rugby player)
Niall Brophy (one of the great Irish international rugby players of the 1950s and '60s)
Brendan Mullin (Irish rugby international of the 1980s and '90s, and one of the country's greatest ever players)
Jordi Murphy (Irish international rugby player)
Brendan Macken (Leinster Rugby and Gloucester Rugby professional rugby union player)
Andrew Conway (Leinster Rugby and Munster Rugby professional rugby union player)
Denis Buckley (Connacht Rugby professional rugby union player)
Niall Morris (rugby union) (Leinster Rugby and Leicester Tigers professional rugby union player)
Ryle Nugent, RTÉ Rugby Commentator
Michael Cusack, Founder of the Gaelic Athletic Association taught at the school
Paul Dunne (golfer)
Alan Lee (Irish international association football player)
Garry Ringrose, (Leinster Rugby professional rugby union player)
Joey Carbery (rugby union) Leinster and Ireland)
Oliver Jager (rugby union) NZ Barbariens and Crusaders)
Fionn Carr (rugby union and sevens) Ireland 7s and Connacht)
Hugo Keenan (Ireland7s)
Mark Roche (Ireland7s)
Nick Timoney (Rugby Union and 7s) Ulster and Ireland 7s)
Conor Oliver (Munster Rugby)
John Quirke (Irish International Rugby Player 1962–1968) 
Peter Robb (Connacht Rugby)
Tommy O'Brien ( Leinster Rugby)
David Pigot Jr. (first-class cricketer)
Liam Turner (Rugby union, Leinster rugby and Ireland U20s)
Thomas Clarkson (rugby union, Leinster rugby and Ireland U20s)
Paddy Patterson (Rugby union and Leinster rugby)
Gavin Mullin (Rugby union and Leinster academy)

Entertainment
Des Bishop, Comedian
Craig Doyle, television presenter
Dave Fanning, DJ, broadcaster
Bob Geldof, musician, lead singer with The Boomtown Rats. Organiser of Live Aid concerts
Frank Kelly, actor
David McSavage, comedian
Ardal O'Hanlon, comic actor
Ryan Tubridy, broadcaster
Conal Gallen, playwright, comedian, singer-songwriter
Jonathon Ng, singer songwriter, known as EDEN

See also
 :Category:People educated at Blackrock College

References

Blackrock, Dublin
Rockmen
Old Rockmen